James R. Riffey (December 14, 1923 – January 30, 2018) was an American professional basketball player. Riffey was selected in the second round (19th overall) of the 1950 NBA Draft by the Fort Wayne Pistons after a collegiate career at Tulane. He played for the Pistons in 35 total games in 1950–51. He died in January 2018 at the age of 94.

References

External links
Indiana Basketball Hall of Fame entry

1923 births
2018 deaths
American men's basketball players
United States Army personnel of World War II
Basketball players from Indiana
Fort Wayne Pistons draft picks
Fort Wayne Pistons players
Forwards (basketball)
Tulane Green Wave men's basketball players
People from Washington, Indiana